Buchberg is the name of the following places:

Municipalities:
 Buchberg (Mecklenburg), Ludwigslust-Parchim district, Mecklenburg-Vorpommern, Germany
 Buchberg SH, Kanton Schaffhausen, Switzerland
Cadastral municipalities and villages:
 Buchberg bei Steinbühl, village in the borough of Bad Kötzting, Cham district, Bavaria
 Buchberg bei Wettzell, village in the borough of Bad Kötzting, Cham district, Bavaria
 Buchberg (Brennberg), village in the municipality of Brennberg, Regensburg district, Bavaria
 Buchberg (Bruckberg), village in the municipality of Bruckberg, Landshut district, Bavaria
 Buchberg (Feldkirchen-Westerham), village in the municipality of Feldkirchen-Westerham, Rosenheim district, Bavaria
 Buchberg (Fischbachau), village in the municipality of Fischbachau, Miesbach district, Bavaria
 Buchberg (Gangkofen), Ortsteil der Marktgemeinde Gangkofen, Rottal-Inn district, Bavaria
 Buchberg (Geretsried), village in the borough of Geretsried, Bad Tölz-Wolfratshausen district, Bavaria
 Buchberg (Herrngiersdorf), village in the municipality of Herrngiersdorf, Kelheim district, Bavaria
 Buchberg (Hohenau), village in the municipality of Hohenau, Freyung-Grafenau district, Bavaria
 Buchberg (Moosthenning), village in the municipality of Moosthenning, Dingolfing-Landau district, Bavaria
 Buchberg (Nußdorf am Inn), village in the municipality of Nußdorf am Inn, Rosenheim district, Bavaria
 Buchberg (Offenberg), village in the municipality of Offenberg, Deggendorf district, Bavaria
 Buchberg (Reut), village in the municipality of Reut, Rottal-Inn district, Bavaria
 Buchberg (Rimsting), village in the municipality of Rimsting, Rosenheim district, Bavaria
 Buchberg (Schleching), village in the municipality of Schleching, Traunstein district, Bavaria
 Buchberg (Sengenthal), village in the municipality of Sengenthal, Neumarkt in the Oberpfalz district, Bavaria
 Buchberg (Taching am See), village in the municipality of Taching am See, Traunstein district, Bavaria
 Buchberg (Traunreut), village in the borough of Traunreut, Traunstein district, Bavaria
 Buchberg (Viechtach), village in the borough of Viechtach, Regen district, Bavaria
 Buchberg (Wackersberg), village in the municipality of Wackersberg, Bad Tölz-Wolfratshausen district, Bavaria
 Buchberg am Kamp, cadastral municipality of Gars am Kamp in Lower Austria
 Buchberg (Bischofshofen), cadastral municipality and mountain in Salzburg
 Buchberg (Gemeinde Ebbs), cadastral municipality in Tyrol
 Buchberg (Gemeinde Goldegg), cadastral municipality in Salzburg 
 Buchberg (Gemeinde Ilz), cadastral municipality in the Styria
 Buchberg (Gemeinde Reinsberg), cadastral municipality in Lower Austria
 Buchberg (Gemeinde Stubenberg), cadastral municipality in the Styria
 a village in the municipality of Bogda, Kreis Timiş, Rumänien
 a settlement in the Iser Mountains, Czech Republic, now part of the village of Jerserka

Buchberg is the name of the following hills and mountains:
 Buchberg (Blumberg), mountain neari Blumberg, Schwarzwald-Baar district, Baden-Württemberg
 Buchberg (Fichtelgebirge), 674 m, mountain near Kirchenlamitz in theBavarian Fichtelgebirge
 Buchberg (Kiefersfelden), mountain with Church of the Holy Cross in the municipality of Kiefersfelden in Bavaria, Germany
 Buchberg (Lange Berge), 528 m, highest mountain the Lange Berge, Coburg district, Bavaria
 Buchberg (Main-Kinzig-Kreis), mountain with observation tower in Langenselbold, Hesse
 Buchberg (Mattsee), 801 m, Aussichtsberg in the municipality of Mattsee, Salzburg state
 Buchberg (Upper Palatinate), 591 m, near Neumarkt, Upper Palatinate, Bavaria
 Buchberg (Seubersdorf), 607,3 m, near Seubersdorf, district Neumarkt in the Oberpfalz, Bavaria
 Buchberg (Zittau Mountains), 652 m, mountain im Zittau Mountains in Saxony, Germany 
 Buchberg (Vienna Woods), 469 m, lookout mountain near Maria-Anzbach, Lower Austria
 Buechberg, 631 m, at the Obersee (Zürichsee) lakeshore, Switzerland 
 Buková hora, 683 m, Bohemian Central Uplands, Czech Republic
 Buková hora, 958 m, Orlické Mountains, Czech Republic
 Bukovec (Isergebirge), 1,005 m, Iser Mountains, Czech Republic
 Goldegger Buchberg, 1,200 m, Dienten Mountains, Salzburg state
 Buchberg near Neusalza-Spremberg (Saxony), see Sonneberg (hill)

See also
 Puchberg (disambiguation)